Killeberg is a locality situated in Osby Municipality, Scania County, Sweden with 585 inhabitants in 2010.

References 

Populated places in Skåne County
Populated places in Osby Municipality